An interregnum is a period of discontinuity in a government, organization, or social order. 

Interregnum may also refer to:

 Interregnum (1649–1660), a period in the history of England, Ireland, and Scotland
 Interregnum (England)
 Interregnum (Ireland)
 Interregnum (Scotland)
 Interregnum (Holy Roman Empire), periods in the history of the Holy Roman Emperor when there was no emperor
 Ottoman Interregnum, civil war in which the sons of Sultan Bayezid I fought for control of the empire.
 Interregnum (Transjordan) (1920–1921)
 Interregnum (History of the Maldives)
 Interregnum of World Chess Champions (1946–1948)
 Interregnum (solitaire), a card game
 George Grosz' Interregnum, a 1960 documentary short film

See also
 Interregnum regent